Caffrocrambus dichotomellus is a moth in the family Crambidae. It was described by George Hampson in 1919. It is found in South Africa, where it has been recorded from the Eastern Cape.

References

Endemic moths of South Africa
Crambinae
Moths described in 1919
Moths of Africa